Beach O' Pines is a private gated community located on the shores of Lake Huron in Lambton County, Ontario, Canada. It is located immediately outside of the community of Grand Bend, Ontario, and is bordered to the northwest by Lake Huron, the southwest by the Pinery Provincial Park, the northeast by the subdivision of Southcott Pines, and the southeast by the Old Ausable Channel, Highway #21, and the subdivision of Huron Woods.

Formation
In 1929, Frank Salter (a well-known developer from Detroit, Michigan) and several friends found themselves in Grand Bend taking shelter from a storm. While there, he explored the surrounding countryside and identified a  parcel that could be developed into a luxury resort. He formed the Frank S. Salter Company Limited (headquartered in Windsor, Ontario), which bought the land from the Canada Company.

Because of the Great Depression, the company scaled back its original plans, and part of the land was subdivided into 35 parcels that were offered for sale together with a right of way over land held by Beach O'Pines Club Limited, for the purpose of ingress and egress from and to Highway 21 and the shore of Lake Huron. The purchasers established the Beach O'Pines Protective Association to improve the property and safeguard their interests.

Antisemitism and racism

Noble v Alley

Restrictive covenants were inserted by the developer in the deeds of transfer that limited ownership to the properties inside Beach O' Pines based upon ethnic origin until August 1962. In April 1948, Bernard Wolf signed an agreement to buy a cottage property in the community. A title search of the property by his lawyer revealed the restrictive covenant in the original property deed, that provided that the land could never be sold, used, occupied, or rented "by any person of the Jewish, Hebrew, Semitic, Negro or coloured race or blood", and he applied to the courts to have it removed.

The application was dismissed by Justice Schroeder, who held that the covenant was valid and enforceable. The covenant was upheld by the Ontario Court of Appeal.

It was subsequently overturned however by the Supreme Court of Canada in a vote of six to one in Noble v Alley because the language used in the text was ambiguous.

On July 11, 2021, the Beach O' Pines Association membership unanimously approved a Statement of Diversity & Inclusion:

Land disputes
When the Beach O' Pines development was originally undertaken, a  parcel was withheld from the original conveyance. The original holding company was dissolved in 1963, and it was determined in 2011 that that land escheated to the Crown. It was conveyed to the Municipality of Lambton Shores that year for use as a greenspace. There have also been issues with the municipality relating to the status of several road allowances and a towpath along the Old Ausable River Channel, that are in the process of being resolved.

References

External links
 
 

Communities in Lambton County
Mitt Romney
Gated communities in Canada
Antisemitism in Canada
Anti-black racism in Canada